The 2013–14 Perth Glory FC season was the club's ninth season in the A-League and its 17th season since its establishment. It was Alistair Edwards' first full season in charge after the sacking of Ian Ferguson; however, he was subsequently sacked as Manager on 17 December 2013, and replaced on an interim basis by Kenny Lowe.

Players

Squad

Transfers

Winter

In

Out

Summer

In

Out

Competitions

Overall

A-League

Pre-season

Friendlies

League table

Results summary

Results by round

Matches

League Goalscorers per Round

Awards
 Player of the Week (Round 9) – Sidnei Sciola

References

Perth Glory FC seasons